Andrew Thomas Thoma (born April 29, 1993) is an American soccer defender.

Career

College and Amateur
Thoma spent his entire college career at the University of Washington. He made a total of 80 appearances for the Huskies and tallied one goal and seven assists.

He also played in the Premier Development League for Washington Crossfire.

Professional
On January 15, 2015, Thoma was selected in the second round (24th overall) of the 2015 MLS SuperDraft by the Portland Timbers. On March 29, he made his debut for USL affiliate club Portland Timbers 2 against Real Monarchs. On December 16, 2015, he was re-signed by Timbers.

Following his release by Portland, Thoma signed with USL side Whitecaps FC 2 on March 3, 2017.

Honors

Club
Portland Timbers
MLS Cup: 2015
Western Conference (playoffs): 2015

References

External links

Washington Huskies bio

1993 births
Living people
American soccer players
Washington Huskies men's soccer players
Washington Crossfire players
Portland Timbers players
Portland Timbers 2 players
Whitecaps FC 2 players
Association football defenders
Soccer players from New Mexico
Portland Timbers draft picks
USL League Two players
USL Championship players
People from Los Alamos, New Mexico